Cook's mouse (Mus cookii) is a species of rodent in the family Muridae.
It is found in southern and south-eastern Asia from India to Vietnam.

References

Mus (rodent)
Rodents of India
Mammals of Nepal
Mammals described in 1914
Taxonomy articles created by Polbot